Nicolas Platter (born November 22, 1981 in Los Angeles, California) is an American soccer player who currently is the goalkeeper coach for North Carolina FC.

Career

College
Platter played college soccer at the University of California, Davis, where is generally considered to be one of the most successful goalkeepers in UC Davis history. He finished his career at UC Davis as the all-time shutout leader with 17, and as the career saves leader with 195. He was also his team's captain since 2003. He also played one season with the Sacramento Knights in the National Premier Soccer League.

Professional
Platter signed with Minnesota Thunder in 2005, and was used primarily a backup to first-choice keeper Joe Warren, playing in just six first team games in his first two years with the club. Platter emerged as the starting goalkeeper for the team in 2007, eventually logging 1,620 minutes in 18 games played, and has continued to hold the starting goalkeeper position through 2008 and into 2009.

After five years with Minnesota Thunder Platter signed a two-year contract with Carolina RailHawks in March 2010. However, the RailHawks were dissolved following the 2010 season (only to be reborn with new ownership) and all players' contracts voided.

Platter signed with Fort Lauderdale Strikers of the North American Soccer League on February 24, 2011.

Platter signed as a player and assistant coach for Carolina RailHawks on March 1, 2012.

After spending the 2013 season out of soccer, Platter rejoined the RailHawks for the 2014 season.
He was an assistant coach for the RailHawks and did goalkeeping coaching for CASL. He is currently a realtor at eXp Realty LLC in the  Triangle Region of North Carolina.

References

External links
 Carolina RailHawks bio
 Minnesota Thunder bio
 UC Davis profile

1981 births
Living people
American soccer players
North Carolina FC players
Fort Lauderdale Strikers players
USL First Division players
Minnesota Thunder players
Sacramento Knights (NPSL) players
USSF Division 2 Professional League players
North American Soccer League players
UC Davis Aggies men's soccer players
Association football goalkeepers
Association football goalkeeping coaches
Soccer players from Los Angeles
National Premier Soccer League players
American real estate brokers